Constantin Hârjeu (December 10, 1856–May 24, 1928) was a Romanian general and engineer.

Born into a poor family in Bucharest, he attended the officers’ school there from 1874 to 1876. Hârjeu then went to the École Polytechnique in Paris and to the School of Applied Artillery at Fontainebleau, becoming among the first Romanian military engineers educated abroad. Returning home, he steadily advanced through the ranks of the Romanian Land Forces, becoming a brigadier general in 1904.

Meanwhile, Hârjeu taught at the Higher War School and at the artillery and military engineering school. His textbooks on topography (1886) and military telegraphy (1890) were widely used. He contributed to military magazines, and in 1900 wrote a French-language study of the Romanian Army. His interest in fortifications led him to author a book on the history of military engineering, awarded a prize by the Romanian Academy in 1902.

Hârjeu was himself elected a corresponding member of the Academy in 1909. He served twice as War Minister: October 1912-January 1914, and March-October 1918. He was also interim Public Works Minister in 1918. He died in Bucharest in 1928.

Notes

References
Teodor Frunzeti, Florian Tucă, Eugen Siteanu, Adrian Ciuche, Mareșali, generali și colonei români, membri ai Academiei Române, in Revista de Științe Militare, nr. I/2013, pp. 44-87

1856 births
1928 deaths
Military personnel from Bucharest
Romanian military engineers
École Polytechnique alumni
Romanian Ministers of Defence
Romanian Land Forces generals
Corresponding members of the Romanian Academy
Academic staff of Carol I National Defence University
Romanian textbook writers
Romanian writers in French